The Sokolov Award, also known as Sokolov Prize, is an Israeli journalism award, awarded by the Tel Aviv municipality, in memory of Nahum Sokolow.

The award has been granted since 1956, initially to outstanding print journalists and since 1981 to journalists from the electronic media. It is considered the most prestigious award for Israeli Journalism, second only to the Israel Prize for Communications.

The prize is awarded annually, in close proximity to Nahum Sokolow's birthday (ה' בשבט, Hebrew calendar), or the anniversary of his death (י"ב באייר, Hebrew calendar).

Objectives
The prize is awarded to encourage journalistic excellence and reward outstanding achievements in investigative journalism.

Committee of Judges
The Sokolov Award's statute stipulates that the mayor shall appoint a selecting committee, consisting of three members, for the purpose of picking the Judges on the award committee. The selecting committee shall include an academy figure, a jurist and a representative of the mayor. The mayor then shall bring the make-up of the selecting committee to the approval of the city council. The selecting committee shall compose the Committee of Judges that will include two senior journalists, two academy figures, and a representative of the municipality. Usually, the make-up of the Committee of Judges who selects the winners of the printed media is different from those who determine the winners of the electronic media.

The Prize
Winners receive a monetary prize. As of 2007, the prize was 18,000 shekels.

Winners

References

External links
List of Sokolow Award recipients (to 2009) on City of Tel Aviv - Yafo website (in Hebrew)

Awards by the municipality of Tel Aviv-Yafo
Israeli journalism awards
Awards established in 1956
Lists of Israeli award winners
1956 establishments in Israel